Barbara Orchard (born 14 August 1930 in Adelaide, South Australia) is an Australian former  cricket player.
Orchard played two tests for the Australia national women's cricket team.

References

1930 births
Living people
Australia women Test cricketers